Hanover Junior-Senior High School is a high school located east of Colorado Springs, Colorado, United States. It is in Hanover School District 28.

References

External links 
 

Schools in Colorado Springs, Colorado
High schools in Colorado Springs, Colorado
Public high schools in Colorado
Public middle schools in Colorado